Arcopilus is a genus of plant and soil fungi. The genus was created in 2016 from several species formerly in the genus Chaetomium.

References

Fungus genera
Sordariales